Tata Avinya is a five-seater, concept electric SUV designed and unveiled by Indian automaker Tata Electric Passenger Mobility Limited (TEPM) on April 29, 2022 in Mumbai. The concept is the first model to be based on the company's "Gen 3 architecture".

The concept is the first one of the new breed of electric vehicles by TEPM, which is based on a new design language set to be introduced in the market by 2025.

Naming 
The word Avinya, derived from the Sanskrit language, means 'innovation'. Avinya, which also has 'in' in its letters, represents its Indian roots.

Design 
The concept, originally inspired by a catamaran, is the company's vision for future electric mobility. It is claimed to be based on a human-centric design and the company claims that the concept has a versatility of a SUV and the comfort of a MPV.Martin Uhlarik is the head of design of this car. 

The concept is the first model to be based on the "Gen 3 architecture", which is the design language of the company that is entirely focused on electric vehicles.The concept also focuses on incorporating sustainable materials in its interiors.

Technology 
The "Pure EV Gen 3 Architecture" of TEPM is a totally new design language entirely optimized for electric vehicles. This design language is supposed to be a flexible language for offering smart, spacious and sustainable vehicles for the future.

One of the main features of this design language is increased range. The vehicles based on this language is set to offer more range than the current electric vehicles of the company. The overall philosophy of enhanced range would be 'Minimize-Maximize-Optimize'.

The company's "Gen 3 architecture" is expected to support connectivity features, advanced driver-assistance system (ADAS) and enhanced performance and efficiency than the current models. The upcoming models on this platform is also expected to have a better water and dust protection engineered to global standards, than the current models.

Tata Avinya concept is said to support ultra-fast charging, giving a minimum claimed range of 500 kilometers under 30 minutes.

References

External Links 

 Official website

Tata concept cars